Boraebong is a mountain in the county of Pyeongchang, Gangwon-do in South Korea.

See also
List of mountains in Korea

Notes

References

Mountains of Gangwon Province, South Korea
Pyeongchang County
Hongcheon County
Mountains of South Korea
One-thousanders of South Korea